Bang! is a 1977 Swedish drama film directed by Jan Troell. It was entered into the 1977 Cannes Film Festival. Håkan Serner won the award for Best Actor at the 13th Guldbagge Awards.

Cast
 Susan Hampshire - Cilla Brown
 Alf Hellberg - Older Colleague
 Kristina Kamnert-Suneson - Cleaning woman
 Kristina Karlin - Cleaning Woman
 Staffan Liljander - Colleague
 Yvonne Lombard - Lena
 Berto Marklund - School Janitor
 Ulf Palme - Johnny
 Agneta Prytz - Mrs. Leonardsson
 Håkan Serner - Hinder
 Beate Ùrskov - Beate
 Eva von Hanno - Rosita
 Åke Whilney - Hinder's Classmate
 Claire Wikholm - Colleague

References

External links

 

1977 films
1977 drama films
Swedish drama films
1970s Swedish-language films
Films directed by Jan Troell
1970s Swedish films